Legio XXX Ulpia Victrix ("Trajan's Victorious Thirtieth Legion") was a legion of the Imperial Roman army. Their emblems were the gods Neptune and Jupiter and the Capricorn. Ulpia is Trajan's own gens (Ulpia), while the cognomen "Victrix" means "victorious," and it was awarded after their valiant behaviour in the Dacian wars.  The legion was active until the disbandment of the Rhine frontier in the beginning of the 5th century.

History 
It was founded in AD 100 by the emperor Trajan for service in the Dacian Wars.

The legion's first base camp was in the province of Dacia in the Danube frontier. It is likely that at least some of its legionaries took part in the Parthian campaigns of Trajan. In 122 they were moved to Colonia Ulpia Traiana (modern Xanten) in Germania Inferior, where they remained for the following centuries. Their main tasks were public construction and police affairs. 

In the 2nd century and the beginning of the 3rd century, units of the XXX Ulpia Victrix were allocated in Parthia, as well as Gaul, Mauretania and other Roman provinces, due to the peaceful situation in Germania Inferior. They fought in Antoninus Pious' campaigns in Mauritania.

In the civil war of 193, XXX Ulpia Victrix supported Septimius Severus, who granted them the title of Pia Fidelis ("faithful and loyal").

The legion was used by Emperor Alexander Severus in his 235 campaign against the Sassanids. Later the legion would be involved in Alexander Severus' campaign on the Rhine Frontier. It was almost certainly involved in Gallienus's wars against the Franks in the 250s. L. Petronius Taurus Volusianus was Primus Pilus of the legion at this time. It supported the Gallic Empire of Postumus (260–274) and suffered great losses when Aurelian overthrew Tetricus I in a bloody battle at the Catalaunian Fields in 274.

With the re-organization of the Roman Army (Constantius I Chlorus), the legions guarding the border lost their importance to the comitatus, the main, cavalry-based army behind the limes. The collapse of the Rhine frontier after 408–410 marked the end of the legion's history.

Attested members

See also 
 List of Roman legions

References

External links
 livius.org account

30 Ulpia Victrix
105 establishments
Military units and formations established in the 2nd century
Trajan